The 2015–16 UMass Minutewomen basketball team will represent the University of Massachusetts Amherst  during the 2015–16 college basketball season. The Minutewomen, led by sixth year head coach Sharon Dawley. The Minutewomen were members of the Atlantic 10 Conference and play their home games at the William D. Mullins Memorial Center. They finished the season 12–18, 5–11 in A-10 to finish in a 4 way tie for tenth place. They advanced to the second round of the A-10 women's tournament where they lost to Fordham.

On March 6, Sharon Dawley was fired. She finished at UMass with a six year record of 46–133.

2015–16 media
All non-televised Minutewomen home games and conference road games will stream on the A-10 Digital Network. WMUA will carry Minutewomen games with Cody Chrusciel on the call.

Roster

Schedule

|-
!colspan=9 style="background:#881c1c; color:#FFFFFF;"| Non-conference regular season

|-
!colspan=9 style="background:#881c1c; color:#FFFFFF;"| Atlantic 10 regular season

|-
!colspan=9 style="background:#881c1c; color:#FFFFFF;"| Atlantic 10 Women's Tournament

Rankings
2015–16 NCAA Division I women's basketball rankings

See also
 2015–16 UMass Minutemen basketball team

References

UMass Minutewomen basketball seasons
UMass